Aerococcus urinae is a Gram-positive bacterium associated with urinary tract infections.

Classification 
Aerococcus urinae is a member of the bacterial genus Aerococcus. The bacterium is a Gram-positive, catalase-negative coccus growing in clusters. Isolates of this genus were originally isolated in 1953 from samples collected in the air and dust of occupied rooms and were distinguished by their tetrad cellular arrangements. Later, it was found in the urine of patients with urinary tract infections and in 1992, A. urinae was assigned as distinct species. Due to difficulties in the biochemical identification of A. urinae in clinical microbiological laboratories, the incidence of infections with this bacterium has likely been underestimated and secure identification relies on genetic techniques like 16S ribosomal subunit sequencing or mass spectroscopic methods such as MALDI-TOF.

Clinical relevance 
A. urinae may also cause invasive infections including urosepsis and infective endocarditis, especially in elderly men with underlying urinary tract diseases.
A. urinae is sensitive to many commonly used antibiotics such as penicillin, cephalosporins, and vancomycin. Nitrofurantoin has been reported to be effective in one series of 42 clinical isolates. The bacterium can form biofilms on foreign materials and can aggregate human platelets, two features of potential importance for the disease causing capacity of this organism.
A. urinae is the most common aerococcus isolated from invasive human infections whereas Aerococcus sanguinicola is isolated from human urine as often as A. urinae.

References

External links
Type strain of Aerococcus urinae at BacDive -  the Bacterial Diversity Metadatabase

Wikipedia articles with sections published in WikiJournal of Medicine
Lactobacillales